Banikane Narhawa  is a village and commune of the Cercle of Niafunké in the Tombouctou Region of Mali.

References

External links
.

Communes of Tombouctou Region